Paiko  may refer to:

Mount Paiko (Greek Πάικον Όρος), a mountain in the Macedonian region of Greece
Paiko (band), a rock-pop band from Paraguay